New Guinea tree frog may refer to several different species of frogs:

 Garman New Guinea tree frog
 Northern New Guinea tree frog
 New Guinea tree frog (Ranoidea genimaculata)
 Southern New Guinea tree frog
 White-lipped tree frog